The 1925 Miami tornado was an intense tornado that struck Dade County, Florida, on April 5, 1925. It remains the deadliest tornado to affect the South Florida county, and it is estimated to have been the most intense tornado to strike the Miami area. The tornado caused five deaths and produced damage totals that were estimated near $200–300,000 (1925 USD). 35 people were also hospitalized because of injuries. The tornado remains the only tornado to cause multiple fatalities in Dade County. While officially unrated, it is estimated that the tornado likely produced F3-level damage based on photographs taken after the passage of the supercell.

Summary
The exact path and strength of the tornado are uncertain, since it occurred prior to modern records which began in 1950. The first tornadoes to directly receive damage ratings on the Fujita scale occurred in 1971.
The 1925 tornado was first reported in its formative stage over the Everglades near Hialeah, where several golfers noted a funnel cloud around 1:00 p.m. Hail was reported with the parent thunderstorm prior to the sighting of the funnel cloud. The slow movement of the storm was accompanied by a large number of people outside during the Sunday afternoon, which led to a considerable number of reports; several reports originated from passing motorists. The vortex touched down around 1:15 p.m., and the tornado was described as a "very slender" funnel that frequently lifted from the ground for brief periods. The debris swirling around the rotation was compared to smoke from "burning oil." Later, as it passed west of Miami, the slow-moving tornado passed over and destroyed the state's largest dairy farm, killing one person and injuring 20 people. Losses from the farm reached $100,000.

The tornado eventually intensified and destroyed numerous properties northwest and north of the city of Miami, causing at least three deaths. Some residents successfully attempted to flee in automobiles, though the cars were wrecked and some were thrown for distances. The tornado became obscured by rain, weakened, and dissipated over the northern portion of Biscayne Bay, though it destroyed some power poles along the eastern half of its damage path. The thunderstorm that spawned the tornado also affected the communities of Ojus, Little River, Biscayne Park, and Lemon City, having traversed the region from Homestead to Fort Lauderdale.

In total, the tornado demolished nearly 50 residences. Five fatalities were related directly to the tornado or injuries from flying debris. One of the deaths occurred inside a restaurant; the building was demolished and a cookstove thrown . Hundreds of people were homeless after the storm, and several residences were destroyed at Biscayne Park.

Confirmed tornadoes

See also
 List of North American tornadoes and tornado outbreaks

Notes

References

M
M
M
Miami Tornado, 1925
Miami tornado
April 1925 events